William Castle (born William Schloss Jr.; April 24, 1914 – May 31, 1977) was an American film director, producer, screenwriter, and actor.

Orphaned at 11, Castle dropped out of high school at 15 to work in the theater. He came to the attention of Columbia Pictures for his talent for promotion and was hired. He learned the trade of filmmaking and became a director, acquiring a reputation for the ability to churn out competent B-movies quickly and on budget. He eventually struck out on his own, producing and directing thrillers, which, despite their low budgets, he effectively promoted using gimmicks, a trademark for which he is best known. He was also the producer for Rosemary's Baby.

Personal life
Castle was born in New York City, the son of Saidie (Snellenberg) and William Schloss. His family was Jewish. His mother died when he was nine. When his father followed a year later, he was left an orphan at the age of 11. He then lived with his older sister.

"Schloss" is German for "castle", and Castle later translated his surname into English as his professional name.

Castle married Ellen Falck, with whom he had two children.

Career

Getting started
At 13, Castle saw the play Dracula, starring Bela Lugosi, and was entranced. He watched performance after performance, eventually managing to meet Lugosi himself. He wrote in his autobiography Step Right Up! I'm Gonna Scare the Pants off America: "I knew then what I wanted to do with my life—I wanted to scare the pants off audiences." Lugosi recommended him for the position of assistant stage manager for the road company tour of the play. The 15-year-old dropped out of high school to take the job. He spent his teenage years working on Broadway in jobs ranging from set-building to acting, which proved good training for the future filmmaker.

He obtained Orson Welles' telephone number and persuaded Welles to lease him the Stony Creek Theatre in Connecticut. (Welles was leaving to begin filming Citizen Kane.) He hired German actress Ellen Schwanneke; upon learning that, under then-current theater guild regulations, German-born actors could appear only in plays originally performed in Germany, Castle claimed he had hired her for the nonexistent play Das ist nicht für Kinder (Not for Children), then spent the following weekend writing the play and having it translated into German. When Nazi Germany sent Schwanneke an invitation to a Munich performance, Castle seized the opportunity for an outrageous publicity stunt. He released to the newspapers what he claimed was a telegram he had sent turning down the request, portraying his star as "the girl who said no to Hitler." To add to the sensationalism, he secretly vandalized the theatre and painted swastikas on the exterior. It worked—the resulting publicity ensured the play's success.

Columbia Pictures and other studios

He left for Hollywood at 23 to work for Harry Cohn at Columbia Pictures. Beginning as a dialogue director for Music in My Heart (1940), he and several others, such as Fred Sears, Mel Ferrer, Henry Levin and Robert Gordon, were selected as feature film directors.

In the 2007 documentary Spine Tingler! The William Castle Story, Castle's daughter states he had a dynamic, outgoing personality that attracted others. He was one of the few people Cohn liked. He learned the film business and graduated to directing inexpensive B-movies, the first being The Chance of a Lifetime, released in 1943. He directed four movies in The Whistler series, and gained a reputation for making films quickly and under budget. He also worked as an associate producer on Orson Welles' film noir The Lady from Shanghai (1947), doing much second unit location work.

On his own: the gimmicks
Ambitions unsatisfied, Castle began making films independently. The inspiration of the 1955 French psychological thriller Les Diaboliques set the genre he would choose. He financed his first movie, Macabre (1958), by mortgaging his house. He came up with the idea to give every customer a certificate for a $1,000 life insurance policy from Lloyd's of London in case they should die of fright during the film. He stationed nurses in the lobbies with hearses parked outside the theaters. Macabre was a hit.

Other films (and gimmicks) followed:
House on Haunted Hill (1959), filmed in "Emergo". A skeleton with red lighted eye sockets attached to wire floated over the audience in the final moments of some showings of the film to parallel the action on screen when a skeleton rises from a vat of acid and pursues the villainous wife of Vincent Price's character. Once word spread about the skeleton, kids enjoyed trying to knock it down with candy boxes, soda cups, or any other objects at hand.

 The Tingler (1959), filmed in "Percepto". The title character is a creature that attaches itself to the human spinal cord. It is activated by fright and can be destroyed only by screaming. Castle purchased military surplus airplane wing de-icers (consisting of vibrating motors) and had a crew travel from theatre to theatre, attaching them to the undersides of some of the seats (in that era, a movie did not necessarily open on the same night nationwide). In the finale, one of the creatures is said to have gotten loose in the movie theater itself. The buzzers were activated as the film's star, Vincent Price, warned the audience to "scream—scream for your lives!" Some sources incorrectly state the seats were wired to give electrical jolts. Filmmaker and Castle fan John Waters recounted in Spine Tingler! how, as a youngster, he searched for a seat that had been wired to enjoy the full effect.
13 Ghosts (1960), filmed in "Illusion-O." Each patron received a handheld ghost viewer/remover. During certain segments of the film, a person could see the ghosts by looking through the red cellophane or hide them by looking through the blue. Without the viewer, the ghosts were somewhat visible. The DVD release included red/blue glasses (not 3D glasses, as sometimes reported) to replicate the effect.
Homicidal (1961). There was a "fright break" with a timer overlaid on the film's climax, as the heroine approaches a house harboring a sadistic killer. The audience had 45 seconds to leave and get a full refund if they were too frightened to see the remainder of the film. In an early showing, wily patrons simply sat through the movie a second time and left at the break to get their money back; to prevent this in future, Castle had different color tickets printed for each showing. About 1% of patrons still demanded refunds. John Waters described Castle's response:

William Castle simply went nuts. He came up with "Coward's Corner," a yellow cardboard booth, manned by a bewildered theater employee in the lobby. When the Fright Break was announced, and you found that you couldn't take it anymore, you had to leave your seat and, in front of the entire audience, follow yellow footsteps up the aisle, bathed in a yellow light. Before you reached Coward's Corner, you crossed yellow lines with the stenciled message: "Cowards Keep Walking." You passed a nurse (in a yellow uniform?...I wonder), who would offer a blood-pressure test. All the while a recording was blaring, "Watch the chicken! Watch him shiver in Coward's Corner!" As the audience howled, you had to go through one final indignity – at Coward's Corner you were forced to sign a yellow card stating, "I am a bona fide coward."

In a trailer for the film, Castle explained the use of the Coward's Certificate and admonished the viewer not to reveal the ending to friends "or they will kill you. If they don't, I will."

 Mr. Sardonicus (1961). The audience could vote on the villain's fate in a "punishment poll" during the climax—Castle appeared on screen to explain two options. Each member of the audience was given a card with a glow-in-the-dark thumb they could hold up or down to decide if Mr. Sardonicus should be cured or die. Supposedly no audience ever chose mercy, so the alternate ending was never screened. Though Castle claimed in his autobiography that the merciful version was shot and shown occasionally, many suspect otherwise. In the drive-in version, drivers were asked to flash their car headlights to choose.
 Zotz! (1962).  Each patron was given a "magic" (gold colored, plastic, glow-in-the-dark) coin.
 13 Frightened Girls (1963). Castle launched a publicized worldwide casting hunt for the prettiest girls from different countries (not 13 as in the title, but 15). He filmed slightly different versions, highlighting each girl for the release in her country.
 Strait-Jacket  (1964). Advised by his financial backers to eliminate gimmicks, Castle hired Joan Crawford to star and sent her on a promotional tour to select theatres. At the last minute, Castle had cardboard axes printed that were handed out to patrons.
I Saw What You Did (1965). Another Joan Crawford vehicle, this film was initially promoted using giant plastic telephones, but after a rash of prank phone calls and complaints, the Bell Telephone Company monopoly refused Castle permission to use them or mention telephones. So he turned the back rows of theatres into "Shock Sections." Seat belts were installed to keep patrons from being jolted from their chairs in fright.
Bug (1975). Castle advertised a million-dollar life insurance policy for the film's star, "Hercules" the cockroach.

At the height of his popularity, Castle had a fan club with 250,000 members.

Rosemary's Baby
According to Spine Tingler! The William Castle Story, he mortgaged his home (again) and obtained the movie rights to the Ira Levin novel before it was published, hoping to finally direct a prestigious A-movie himself. He made a deal with Paramount Pictures, then under Robert Evans, who insisted on hiring director Roman Polanski. Castle had to settle for producing the film. He had a cameo, playing the grey-haired man standing outside the phone booth where Rosemary, played by Mia Farrow, is attempting to get in touch with the obstetrician.

Castle was unable to build on the film's success. He suffered kidney failure soon after its release. By the time he recovered, all momentum was lost, and he went back to making B-movies. His most significant acting role was also his last—as the director of the doomed "Waterloo" epic in The Day of the Locust in 1975.

Death
Castle died on May 31, 1977, in Los Angeles, California, of a heart attack. He is interred in the Forest Lawn Memorial Park Cemetery in Glendale, California.

Legacy
Alfred Hitchcock decided to make Psycho after noting the financial success of 1950s B-movies by Castle and Roger Corman.

Among his admirers is filmmaker John Waters, who wrote, "William Castle was my idol. His films made me want to make films... William Castle was God." Waters portrayed Castle in the episode "Hagsploitation" in the first season of the FX television anthology series Feud, depicting the notorious rivalry between Bette Davis and Joan Crawford through the production and aftermath of What Ever Happened to Baby Jane? Waters (playing Castle) appeared onstage at an Oklahoma theater in 1964, exuberantly introducing a screening of Strait-Jacket while Jessica Lange (as Crawford) proceeded down the aisle, wincing and wielding an axe past hooting teenagers before pursuing Castle behind a backlit scrim to "decapitate" him in silhouette.

He is Robert Zemeckis's "favorite filmmaker." Zemeckis co-founded Dark Castle Entertainment, which was intended to remake Castle's films.

Two of his films were remade by his daughter Terry Ann Castle, who co-produced House on Haunted Hill in 1999 and Thirteen Ghosts in 2001 (the latter retitled Thir13en Ghosts).

A documentary focusing on Castle's life, Spine Tingler! The William Castle Story, directed by Jeffrey Schwarz, premiered at AFI Fest 2007 in Los Angeles on November 8, 2007. It won the Audience Award for Best Documentary.

The protagonist in the 1993 film Matinee, played by John Goodman, is based on Castle.

Filmography

As director

 Coney Island (1939 documentary short)
 Black Marketing (1943 documentary short)
 Klondike Kate (1943)
 The Chance of a Lifetime (1943)
 The Whistler (1944)
 She's a Soldier Too (1944)
 When Strangers Marry (1944)
 The Mark of the Whistler (1944)
 Voice of the Whistler (1945)
 Crime Doctor's Warning (1945)
 Just Before Dawn (Exposed By The Crime Doctor) (1946)
 Mysterious Intruder (1946)
The Return of Rusty (1946)
 Crime Doctor's Man Hunt (1946)
 Crime Doctor's Gamble (1947)
 Texas, Brooklyn and Heaven (1948)
 The Gentleman from Nowhere (1948)
 Johnny Stool Pigeon (1949)
 Undertow (1949)
 It's a Small World (1950)
 The Fat Man (1951)
 Hollywood Story (1951)
 Cave of Outlaws (1951)
 Fort Ti (3-D) (1953)
 Serpent of the Nile (1953)
 Conquest of Cochise (1953)
 Slaves of Babylon (1953)
 Masterson of Kansas (1954)
 Charge of the Lancers (1954)
 The Battle of Rogue River (1954)
 The Iron Glove (1954)
 Jesse James vs. the Daltons (1954)
 Drums of Tahiti (1954)
 The Saracen Blade (1954)
 The Law vs. Billy the Kid (1954)
 The Americano (1955)
 New Orleans Uncensored (1955)
 The Gun That Won the West (1955)
 Duel on the Mississippi (1955)
 The Houston Story (1956)
 Uranium Boom (1956)
 Macabre (1958)
 House on Haunted Hill (1959)
 The Tingler (1959)
 13 Ghosts (1960)
 Homicidal (1961)
 Mr. Sardonicus (1961)
 Zotz! (1962)
 13 Frightened Girls (1963)
 The Old Dark House (1963)
 Strait-Jacket (1964)
 The Night Walker (1964)
 I Saw What You Did (1965)
 Let's Kill Uncle (1966)
 The Busy Body (1967)
 The Spirit Is Willing (1967)
 Project X (1968)
 Shanks (1974)

As producer

 The Lady From Shanghai (1947, associate producer)
 Macabre (1958)
 House on Haunted Hill (1959)
 The Tingler (1959)
 13 Ghosts (1960)
 Homicidal (1961)
 Mr. Sardonicus (1961)
 Zotz! (1962)
 13 Frightened Girls (1963)
 The Old Dark House (1963)
 Strait-Jacket (1964)
 The Night Walker (1964)
 I Saw What You Did (1965)
 Let's Kill Uncle (1966)
 The Busy Body (1967)
 The Spirit Is Willing (1967)
 Project X (1968)
 Rosemary's Baby (1968)
 Riot (1969)
 Shanks (1974)
 Bug (1975)

As writer
 North to the Klondike (1942, story)
 Dillinger (1945, uncredited)
 Voice of the Whistler  (1945)
 The Lady From Shanghai (1947, uncredited)
 It's a Small World (1950)
 The Plot Thickens (1963 TV movie)
 Bug (1975)

As actor

 When Love Is Young (1937)Reporter (uncredited)
 It Could Happen to You! (1937)Dignified Reporter (uncredited)
 The Man Who Cried Wolf (1937)Customer at Box Office (uncredited)
 The Lady in Question (1940)Angry Juror #1 (uncredited)
 He Stayed for Breakfast (1940)Policeman (uncredited)
 When Strangers Marry (1944)Seen in photograph given to the police (uncredited)
 It's a Small World (1950)Cop (uncredited)
 Hollywood Story (1951)Himself
 The Tingler (1959)Prologue as himself (uncredited)
 A Christmas Festival (1959 TV movie)The Cold Man
 13 Ghosts (1960)Himself
 Homicidal (1961)Himself
 Mr. Sardonicus (1961)Himself
Zotz! (1962)Himself (seen during the 1936 Columbia Pictures opening logo variation)
 Let's Kill Uncle (1966)Russell Harrison (in car wreck) (uncredited)
 The Spirit Is Willing (1967)Mr. Hymer (uncredited)
 Rosemary's Baby (1968)Man by Pay Phone (uncredited)
 The Sex Symbol (1974 TV movie)Jack P. Harper
 Shanks (1974)Grocer
 Shampoo (1975)Sid Roth
 Bug (1975)(uncredited)
 The Day of the Locust (1975)Director (final film role)

Television credits

As director
 The Man Called X (1956, episode "Assassination")
 Science Fiction Theatre (1956, episode "Who Is This Man?")
 The Court of Last Resort (1957, episode "The Jim Thompson Case")
 The Californians (1957, two episodes)
 Men of Annapolis (1957, 11 episodes)
 Man with a Camera (1958, episode "Closeup on Violence")
 Target (1958, two episodes)

As producer
 The Adventures of McGraw (1958, four episodes)
 Men of Annapolis (1957–1958, 37 episodes)
 Ghost Story (1972-1973, 2 episodes as producer and actor; 1972–1973, 21 episodes as executive producer)

References

Bibliography
 Castle, William, with introduction by John Waters (1976, republished 1992, republished 2010). Step Right Up! I'm Gonna Scare the Pants Off America: Memoirs of a B-Movie Mogul. New York, Putnam.  (Pharos edition 1992).  (William Castle Productions 2010).
 Castle, William and Joseph, Robert, with introduction by Orson Welles (1945). Hero's Oak. New York, The Reader's Press.
 Waters, John (1983). Crackpot: The Obsessions of John Waters. New York, Macmillan Publishing Company. Chapter 2, "Whatever Happened to Showmanship?", was originally published in American Film December 1983 in a slightly different form.
 Castle, William (2011). "From the Grave: The Prayer". William Castle Productions. .
 Documentary. Spine Tingler! The William Castle Story (2007) Director: Jeffrey Schwarz
 Robert Bloch. Once Around the Bloch: An Unauthorised Autobiography. NY: Tor Books, 1993. Chapter 35 deals with Bloch's experiences scripting Strait-Jacket for Castle.

External links

1914 births
1977 deaths
Film producers from California
American male film actors
American male television actors
American television directors
Television producers from California
American male screenwriters
Burials at Forest Lawn Memorial Park (Glendale)
Horror film directors
Jewish American male actors
Jewish American screenwriters
Male actors from New York City
People from Beverly Hills, California
20th-century American male actors
20th-century American businesspeople
Screenwriters from New York (state)
Film directors from California
Screenwriters from California
Television producers from New York City
Film producers from New York (state)
20th-century American male writers
20th-century American screenwriters
20th-century American Jews
Horror film producers